Vinnie Mele (born as Vincenzo Seraphino Mele, February 17, 1977) is an American singer, actor, composer, and instrumentalist. His style is influenced by blues, southern rock, reggae, and country music. Mele's songs contain humor and pop culture references.

Early life
Vinnie Mele, was born Vincenzo Seraphino Mele in Marietta, Ohio, the son of Anthony Mele Sr., who was the founding executive director of Washington Morgan Community Action Agency from 1967–1987, and Ada (Casto), a beautician. His parents owned a Mel's beauty salon. Mele's father is Italian-American, and his mother is Irish-American. Mele has a sister and a brother. Mele was raised in the Norwood neighborhood of Marietta, Ohio. Mele's musical talents soon came to the fore when he learned the saxophone at the age of nine. Mele loved singing at an early age, his first public performance was at age fourteen, and he recorded with a local rock band at sixteen.

Mele started playing guitar in his early teens. His love of the blues, rock, and soul music flourished as he started collecting records. He attended Marietta High School and Washington State Community College in Marietta. During High School Mele worked at a local music store selling and repairing musical instruments. Mele also worked for a sound-rental company and a recording studio during this time. After an unsuccessful attempt to study music academically, Mele acquired a position with the local cable company.

Career
In 1993 Mele formed his first band, named "Souls of Silence" which later got renamed "Quantum Placit". He often describes Quantum Placit as "the best band from Marietta you never heard of". Mele's guitar and vocals contributed greatly to Quantum Placit's set list of cover songs by the Cure, Rush, Eagles, Green Day, Poison, U2, Eric Clapton and Mister Black. Members of Quantum Placit were: Aaron Curran, James Keaton, Jeremy Harmon, Todd Elliott, Jessie Paige, Vinnie Mele, Todd Richards, John Richardson, and Emily Welch.

Quantum Placit became QP3 in 1995 when many of the members went off to college. In 1999 the drummer, Aaron Curran moved from the area. Mele and Harmon posted ads on the internet for a drummer. Dean Vellenga who recently moved to Athens, Ohio replied and auditioned for the position.

Mele, Harmon, and Vellenga had that in the pocket sound. It inspired music veteran Dave Martin to hire QP3 as his backup band. For the next three years, QP3 performed as the Dave Martin Band. Mele learned a lot from Martin's guitar playing, he also credits most of his musical influences were created during this time.

In 2003, Mele formed Vinnie and the Lubricators, performing a variety of music styles: rock, funk, blues, jazz, and reggae. Mele also performed with other local groups. To keep busy as a musician, he also hosted a weekly open mic at a local pub.

In 2009, Mele started his solo career. He was set to release his first album of original music titled  Painting Pictures. After the studio session's Mele decided to put the release on the back burner. To date this album has not been released. In 2012, Mele released his debut CD "35", none of the tracks were of those from the "Painting Pictures" Sessions. Mele has a second album to be released in 2013.

Mele continues to record and tour. He has appeared at the Brickstreet BBQ Festival, and was a supporting act on the MBC's 2008–2009 concert series. Mele has worked and performed with artists such as Koko Taylor, Hubert Sumlin, Lucky Peterson, Stella, Merl Sanders, Exile, Pierre Bensusan, Hank Williams Jr. & III, the Grass Roots, Peter Dickinson, Jimmy Rogers, Trace Adkins, and B.J. Thomas.

Equipment and members who perform with Vinnie Mele
Mele has generally played Fender Stratocaster, Telecaster, and Paul Reed Smith guitars. Mele is also known to use a Dr. Z Maz 38 Combo, sometimes paired with a Fender amp, such as a Blackface Super Reverb or Vibrolux.

Mele's current band:
Vinnie Mele – guitar, vocals
Chris Shepard – drums
Jason Feathers – keyboards
Jeremy Harmon – bass guitar

Mele also performs with the Jimmy Clinton Band, Colton Pack, Taylor Sams, and Vinnie and the Lubricators.

Discography

Albums
 2009 – Painting Pictures

References

External links

Myspace band page

1977 births
Living people
Contemporary blues musicians
Electric blues musicians
Soul-blues musicians
American blues singers
American blues guitarists
American male guitarists
Songwriters from Ohio
Grammy Award winners
People from Marietta, Ohio
American people of Italian descent
Guitarists from Ohio
21st-century American singers
21st-century American guitarists
21st-century American male singers
American male songwriters